Alvin Austin Attles Jr. (born November 7, 1936) is an American former professional basketball player and coach best known for his longtime association with the Golden State Warriors. Nicknamed the "Destroyer", he played the point guard position and spent his entire 11 seasons (1960–1971) in the National Basketball Association (NBA) with the team, joining it when it was still based in Philadelphia and following it to the Bay Area in 1962. He took over as player-coach for the last season of his career, and remained as head coach until 1983 (save for 21 games in 1980).

Early life
He is a graduate of Weequahic High School in Newark, New Jersey and North Carolina A&T State University. He has a bachelor's degree in Physical Education and History along with a master's degree in Curriculum and Instruction. He intended to return to Newark and coach at his local junior high school when he was drafted by the Warriors. He initially declined before accepting and going to training camp.

Playing career

Attles joined the then-Philadelphia Warriors in 1960. On March 2, 1962, he was the team's second-leading scorer with 17 points on the night Wilt Chamberlain scored 100 points. There is a probably apocryphal story to the effect that one of the sportswriters covering the game began his filing with the lede "HERSHEY, Pa. – Wilt Chamberlain and Al Attles combined for 117 points last night as the Philadelphia Warriors defeated the New York Knicks 169–147." Attles moved with the team to the Bay Area at the end of the 1962 season, playing until 1971. Attles was known as "The Destroyer" due to his defensive specialities along with once punching a player in the jaw. He was a role player on the 1964 Warriors team (with Wilt Chamberlain and Guy Rodgers) that made the NBA Finals and eventually lost the championship series to the Boston Celtics, four games to one. Attles also played on the Warriors' 1967 team that lost to Chamberlain's 68–13 Philadelphia 76ers in an evenly matched, six-game championship series.

Coaching career
Attles became an assistant coach in 1968, while still a player. He was named player-coach of the Warriors midway through the 1969–70 season, succeeding George Lee. He was one of the first African-American head coaches in the NBA. He retired as a player after the 1970–71 season, and stayed on as head coach, guiding the Rick Barry-led Warriors to the 1975 NBA championship over the heavily favored Washington Bullets, making him the second African-American coach to win an NBA title (the first was Bill Russell). Attles's team tried to repeat the following season, but they lost to the Phoenix Suns in the Conference Finals in seven games. The team would make the playoffs only once more for the remainder of his tenure as coach. Attles was replaced by Johnny Bach for the last 21 games of the 1979–80 NBA season (a season in which the Warriors finished tied for last place), though he returned for the next season (Bach would become Attles's permanent successor after 1983). Attles coached the Warriors until 1983, compiling a 557–518 regular-season record (588–548 including playoffs) with six playoff appearances in 14 seasons. During the 1983–84 NBA season, Attles worked as the Warriors' general manager. He is the longest-serving coach in Warriors history, and also has the most wins in franchise history.

Honors

In 2014, Attles was the recipient of the John W. Bunn Lifetime Achievement Award—an annual basketball award given by the Naismith Memorial Basketball Hall of Fame to an individual who has contributed significantly to the sport of basketball, the award is the highest and the most prestigious honor presented by the Basketball Hall of Fame other than enshrinement.

Attles's number 16 is retired by the Warriors and he attends every Warriors home game. He also serves as a team ambassador. On February 7, 2015, Attles's number 22 was retired by North Carolina A&T, the first ever retired by the team. He was inducted into the Bay Area Sports Hall of Fame in 1993.

Attles has been on the Warriors' payroll in one capacity or another for 62 years, the longest uninterrupted streak of any person for one team. He is one of the last living members of the franchise who dates to their time in Philadelphia.

On April 6, 2019, Attles was chosen as a member of the Naismith Memorial Basketball Hall of Fame.

Personal life 
Attles is Catholic.

Head coaching record

|-
| align="left" |San Francisco
| align="left" |
|30||8||22|||||style="text-align:center;"|6th in Western ||—||—||—||—
|style="text-align:center;"|—
|-
| align="left" |San Francisco
| align="left" |
|82||41||41|||||style="text-align:center;"|2nd in Pacific||5||1||4||
|style="text-align:center;"|Lost in Conf. Semifinals
|-
| align="left" |Golden State
| align="left" |
|82||51||31|||||style="text-align:center;"| 2nd in Pacific||5||1||4||
|style="text-align:center;"|Lost in Conf. Semifinals
|-
| align="left" |Golden State
| align="left" |
|82||47||35|||||style="text-align:center;"| 2nd in Pacific||11||5||6||
|style="text-align:center;"|Lost in Conf. Finals
|-
| align="left" |Golden State
| align="left" |
|82||44||38|||||style="text-align:center;"|2nd in Pacific||—||—||—||—
|style="text-align:center;"|—
|- ! style="background:#FDE910;"
| align="left" |Golden State
| align="left" |
|82||48||34|||||style="text-align:center;"|1st in Pacific||17||12||5||
|style="text-align:center;"|Won NBA Championship
|-
| align="left" |Golden State
| align="left" |
|82||59||23|||||style="text-align:center;"|1st in Pacific||13||7||6||
|style="text-align:center;"|Lost in Conf. Finals
|-
| align="left" |Golden State
| align="left" |
|82||46||36|||||style="text-align:center;"|3rd in Pacific||10||5||5||
|style="text-align:center;"|Lost in Conf. Semifinals
|-
| align="left" |Golden State
| align="left" |
|82||43||39|||||style="text-align:center;"|5th in Pacific||—||—||—||—
|style="text-align:center;"|—
|-
| align="left" |Golden State
| align="left" |
|82||38||44|||||style="text-align:center;"|6th in Pacific||—||—||—||—
|style="text-align:center;"|—
|-
| align="left" |Golden State
| align="left" |
|61||18||43|||||style="text-align:center;"|6th in Pacific||—||—||—||—
|style="text-align:center;"|—
|-
| align="left" |Golden State
| align="left" |
|82||39||43|||||style="text-align:center;"|4th in Pacific||—||—||—||—
|style="text-align:center;"|—
|-
| align="left" |Golden State
| align="left" |
|82||45||37|||||style="text-align:center;"|4th in Pacific||—||—||—||—
|style="text-align:center;"|—
|-
| align="left" |Golden State
| align="left" |
|82||30||52|||||style="text-align:center;"|5th in Pacific||—||—||—||—
|style="text-align:center;"|—
|-
|-class="sortbottom"
| align="left" |Career
| ||1,075||557||518|||| ||61||31||30||||

References

External links

 Basketball-Reference.com: Al Attles (as coach) 

1936 births
Living people
African-American basketball coaches
African-American basketball players
African-American sports executives and administrators
American men's basketball coaches
American men's basketball players
American sports executives and administrators
Basketball coaches from New Jersey
Basketball players from Newark, New Jersey
Golden State Warriors head coaches
Naismith Memorial Basketball Hall of Fame inductees
National Basketball Association championship-winning head coaches
National Basketball Association players with retired numbers
North Carolina A&T Aggies men's basketball players
Philadelphia Warriors draft picks
Philadelphia Warriors players
Player-coaches
Point guards
San Francisco Warriors head coaches
San Francisco Warriors players
Weequahic High School alumni
African-American Catholics
21st-century African-American people
20th-century African-American sportspeople